Jan Stanisław Franciszek Czerski (3 May 1845, in Swolna – 25 June 1892, nr. Kolyma) was a Polish paleontologist, osteologist, geologist, geographer and explorer of Siberia.

He was exiled to Transbaikalia for participating in the January Uprising of 1863. A self-taught scientist, he eventually received three gold medals from the Russian Geographical Society, and his name was given to a settlement, two mountain ranges, several peaks and other sites. He authored the first map of Lake Baikal.

Biography
Son of Xenia and Dominik Czerski, members of the Lithuanian-Polish nobility, he was born in the then Vitebsk Governorate of the Russian Empire (now in Vitebsk Region, Belarus). At the age of 18, as a high-school student of the Institute for Nobles in Vilnius, he took part in the January Uprising (1863–1864). He was captured and taken prisoner on 28 April 1863, and then stripped of his noble status, his lands confiscated and repossessed by another family member loyal to the Russian government. Czerski was then forcibly conscripted into the Russian Army and sentenced to be exiled to Siberia in Blagoveshchensk near the Amur River. He never made it to Blagoveshchensk, but was detached instead to serve in a formation near Omsk. During this time he was befriended by several Poles living in exile in the Omsk region, including: Marczewski and Kwiatkowski, as well as a Russian geographer, Grigory Nikolayevich Potanin. Under their influence, he became interested in the natural history of the region. They provided him with literature on Siberia and the natural sciences, so that during his free time he was able to educate himself and carry out his first research.

After release from the army in 1869, he was not given permission to return home, and became a political exile. He was refused entry to university; his publications and his first attempt to join the Russian Geographical Society were also rejected. For the next two years he was forced to work as a teacher in Omsk, having been denied the right to leave the area.

In 1871 he received permission to move to Irkutsk where he met other Polish exiles, turned scholars, Aleksander Czekanowski and Benedykt Dybowski. With their help, Czekanowski is considered his mentor, he was able to join the Russian Geographical Society. He secured a job at a local museum and took part in several expeditions, gaining both experience and prominence. He took part in expeditions to the Sayan Mountains, Irkut River Valley and the Lower Tunguska River. During four expeditions (1877–1881) Czerski explored the valley of the Selenga river and published a study on Lake Baikal, explaining the origin of the lake and presenting the geological structure of East Siberia. Perhaps the most notable of these expeditions was to study of the geological structure of the coast of Lake Baikal. The result was the first geological map of that coast, for which Czerski was awarded a gold medal by the Russian Academy of Sciences. He received three medals in total during his career. He received an international award from the University of Bologna, Italy.  Czerski later put forward the idea for the development of topographic reliefs (1878) and produced one of the first analyses of the tectonics of central Asia (1886) and pioneered geomorphological evolution theory.

In 1878 he married Marfa Pavlovna Ivanova, a native of Siberia. In 1883 he was pardoned by the Russian government, and later regained his nobility status. He lived in Irkutsk until 1886, working in the east-Siberian section of the Russian Geographical Society. In 1886, he fell ill with progressive tuberculosis and partial paralysis. He was allowed to move to Saint Petersburg, where he joined the St Petersburg Science Academy. Despite his failing health he took time during his travel from Irkutsk to Petersburg to carefully document the geological details along the way. During this period he was appointed head of an expedition to explore the Yana, Indigirka and Kolyma river basins. He collected and catalogued over 2,500 ancient bones, publishing a large work on Quaternary Period mammals in 1888, followed by an even larger work on Siberian mammal fossils in 1891.

He died on 25 June 1892 during an expedition to the Kolyma, Yana and Indigirka Rivers. He was buried near the Omolon River.

Named after Czerski
Several landmarks in Siberia were named in his honour, including:
 the Chersky Range in the East Siberian Mountains
 the Chersky (settlement) in the Sakha Republic 
 the Chersky Range in Chita Oblast 
 the Chersky Mountain - highest peak (2572 m) of the Baikal Range 
 the Chersky Peak (2090 m) - one of the highest peaks of the Khamar-Daban Range
 the Chersky Pass in the same mountains
 the Chersky Stone (728 m) - a peak nearby in Listvyanka
 the Chersky Valley and Chersky Plateau in the Sayan Mountains 
 a waterfall near the Baikal Lake, 
 an inactive volcano in the Tunkinsk Valley 
 Chersky's Place - an archeological site near Irkutsk where ancient human remains were discovered
 
In 2016, after being acquired by Gazprom, the pipe-layer "Jascon 18"  was renamed "Akademik Cherskiy".

Three species of anomal fossils were named after him: Osteolepis tscherskii (fish), Leperditia czerskii (crustacean) and Polyptchites tscherskii](ammonite) as well as numerous extant species, including cyprinid fish Sarcocheilichthys czerskii, sculpin Cottus czerskii, char Salvelinus czerskii, Baikal endemic amphipod Eulimnogammarus czerskii and bumblebee Bombus czerskii.
The Irkutsk-based Jan Czerski Belarusian Culture Society, an organization of the Belarusian minority in Russia is named after Jan Czerski.
A street in Vilnius, Lithuania, is named after Jan Czerski, Jonas Čerskis''.

Works

The full list of Czerski's works contains 97 positions. Over a hundred published works have been dedicated to him.
 "Otczot o gieołogiczeskom issledowanii bieriegowoj połosy oziera Bajkała" (1886)
 "Gieołogiczeskije issledowanije Sibirskogo pocztowogo trakta ot oziera Bajkała do wostocznogo chriebta Uralskogo" (1888)
 "Dziennik podróży A. Czekanowskiego" (Czekanowski's Travel Journal)
 His major work in 1891

See also
 Bronisław Piłsudski

Notes

References
  WIEM Encyklopedia, Czerski Jan 
  PWN Encyklopedia, Czerski Jan
  Monika Szabłowska−Zaremba, Badacz Świętego Morza Syberii
  Halina Urban, Jan Czerski. Biography in Muzeum Geologiczne (Geological Museum) of Państwowy Instytut Geologiczny (Polish National Geological Institute)
  JAN CZERSKI. Biography
  Maria Dybowska, Jan Czerski. Short biography

Further reading
 Przegląd Geologiczny, nr 11, 1962.
 Sidorski D., Zielony ocean, Ossolineum, 1973.
 Twarogowski J., Poczet wielkich geologów, Warszawa 1974.
 Wójcik Z., Jan Czerski, Wydawnictwo Lubelskie, Lublin 1986.
 
 Shishanov V.A. Moor Cherskaya: time memories // Archives of Vitebsk heritage as a source of learning history of the region: Proceedings of archival reading dedicated to the 150th anniversary of the birth of A.P.Sapunova. 6–7 June 2002, Vitebsk / Warehouse V.V.Skalaban etc. Minsk: BelNDIDAS, 2002. pp. 111–120..

External links
 Jan Czerski  - Russian TV, March 2016.

1845 births
1892 deaths
People from Verkhnyadzvinsk District
People from Drissensky Uyezd
Polish nobility
Polish explorers
Polish geographers
19th-century Polish geologists
Polish paleontologists
Polish entomologists
Belarusian geologists
Explorers of Siberia
History of Siberia
January Uprising participants
Polish prisoners and detainees
Polish exiles in the Russian Empire